Bob Tallman born Robert Matthew Tallman (born October 25, 1947) is a ProRodeo Hall of Fame American rodeo announcer. He is known as "the voice of professional rodeo".

Life
Bob Tallman was born Robert Matthew Tallman on October 25, 1947, in Orovada, Nevada to rancher John B. Tallman and his wife Irene Capelli. Tallman and his sister, Maryanne, grew up on the family's Willow Creek cattle ranch, near Orovada. The Tallmans moved into Winnemucca when Bob was 10 years old. He tried football in high school, but it did not work out athletically. He had a natural talent for golf, but he loved rodeo more, and he could rope. He gained some experience roping in high school and in 4-H. He went to California Polytechnic State University in San Luis Obispo, California. He was there to rope, but he cared more about spending time with his friends. He did try to ride bucking horses, but was advised by the Canadian bull rider Bob Robinson, "find something else". He attended a rodeo in Fallon, Nevada, circa 1969 where he roped calves. He told the stock contractor that the announcer was, "pitiful". The contractor told him to do it when he was done roping. Tallman did and was paid $100 a performance.

Career
Tallman has announced more than 15,000 rodeo performances in the U.S., Mexico, Canada, Australia and New Zealand.
He has announced so many rodeos that his voice has become instantly recognizable to rodeo fans. Tallman has announced the National Finals Rodeo in Las Vegas, Nevada, more than any other announcer. He has announced the Houston Livestock Show and Rodeo for over 30 years. He is the spokesman for many cowboy-themed products. He refers to his voice as his "priceless gift from God" and tries to use it to touch peoples' lives. During the 1990s, Bob Tallman co-hosted the ground-breaking reality outdoor show, Spur of the Moment, celebrating rodeo and the western lifestyle. His co-host was champion barrel racer, Sharon Camarillo. The show was produced by Pat Turner, Stacy Ratliff (both from Jimmy Houston Productions), Lee Adelman, and Dan Stewart. also during the 1990s, Tallman was a television color commentator for the now-defunct Bull Riders Only (BRO) circuit. During most of its run, his fellow commentator was 1970 Rodeo Cowboys Association (RCA) World Champion bull rider Gary Leffew. In later years, he would be joined as a commentator by fellow rodeo announcer and close friend, Boyd Polhamus. Tallman would later be a television color commentator during the very early years of the now-defunct Championship Bull Riding (CBR) circuit. He was also a member of the board of directors of said organization for several years.

Honors
 12-time PRCA Announcer of the Year
 2004 ProRodeo Hall of Fame
 2005 St. Paul Rodeo Hall of Fame
 2006 Texas Cowboy Hall of Fame
 2006 Miss Rodeo America Hall of Fame
 2007 Rodeo Hall of Fame of the National Cowboy and Western Heritage Museum
 2017 Bull Riding Hall of Fame
 2019 Reno Rodeo Hall of Fame
 2019 Texas Rodeo Cowboy Hall of Fame
 2020 ProRodeo Hall of Fame Legend of ProRodeo award

Personal life
Tallman and his wife reside in Poolville, Texas. He raises Angus cows and calves on his ranch.

References

1947 births
Living people
Ranchers from Texas
American male film actors
People from Winnemucca, Nevada
People from Weatherford, Texas
American philanthropists
ProRodeo Hall of Fame inductees
Rodeo announcers
American evangelicals
21st-century Christians